Usmanovo (Uśman) is a rural locality (a village) in Turumbetovsky Selsoviet, Aurgazinsky District, Bashkortostan, Russia. The population was 279 as of 2010.

Demonym and the second name of the village of Usmanovo is Kazburun.

Geography 
It is located 26 km from Tolbazy and 6 km from Turumbet.

References 

Rural localities in Aurgazinsky District